Antonio Sacchetti (8 January 1790, Venice - 15 April 1870, Warsaw) was an Italian-born scenic designer and painter, who spent most of his career in Prague and Warsaw.

Biography 

From 1814 to 1817, he worked with his father in Brno, where they painted theatrical decorations. In 1818, they moved to Prague, to work at the Estates Theatre. In 1829, when Antonio left to pursue his own career, his father remained there for another year, then went to Vienna, where he died in 1836.

Antonio chose to settle in Warsaw, where he painted backdrops for plays and operas at the Grand Theatre. He opened a "panoramic agency" at the theater; exhibiting panoramic paintings of Istanbul, Prague, Trieste, Istria, the death of Józef Poniatowski at the Battle of Leipzig, the eruption of Mount Vesuvius, and several others. During the November Uprising, he took up temporary residence in Dresden. For most of 1835, he was in Kalisz, painting a curtain and decorations for the town theatre. When he returned to Warsaw, he spent the next thirty-five years working at the Grand Theatre and its associated venues.

He also performed work in other locations, including Vienna (1833), Berlin (1834) and, in 1852, back in Prague at the Estates Theatre, where he created sets for William Tell by Rossini. His last sets (1869) were created for the premiere of Paria, an opera by Stanisław Moniuszko. Four of his works may be seen at the Moravian Gallery in Brno.

He was married to Teresa née Rath (1791-1869), originally from Vienna. They had no children.

References

Further reading 
 Brief biography of Sacchetti by G. E. Ferrari @ the Österreichisches Biographisches Lexikon

External links

 Works by Sacchetti @ the Moravian Gallery

1790 births
1870 deaths
Italian artists
Artists from Warsaw
Scenic designers
Italian emigrants to Poland
Panoramic art
Artists from Venice